Zefta (  , Coptic: ⲍⲉⲃⲉⲑⲉ Zevethe) is an Egyptian town in the Nile delta, within the Gharbia governorate. It is across the Nile from Mit Ghamr city of Ad Daqahliyah governorate.

History
In the 12th century, Zefta was an important regional trading center, especially for textiles; silk, flax, indigo, sesame, and sugar were among the commodities bought and sold here. Some of these products were consumed locally, while others were sent to other towns, including Cairo.

In the 1670s, Abbas Agha, the Chief Eunuch of the Ottoman Empire, made a large waqf endowment consisting of diverse Egyptian properties. Zefta was home to the single largest number of properties he endowed, leading Jane Hathaway to describe it as his "pet charity". Among Abbas Agha's endowments in Zefta was a large complex where coffee beans were pounded and roasted, along with an associated coffeehouse. Hathaway hypothesizes that, given its earlier importance as a trade center, 17th-century Zefta remained an important entrepot where boats carrying coffee from Suez to Cairo would stop. From Zefta, the coffee would then have been taken into other towns for consumption. Other properties Abbas Agha endowed in Zifta included a qaysariyya, caravanserai, fifteen shops and two workshops, and a school teaching the Qur'an - the only school included in the endowment. He also left four copper vessels to the physicians of Zefta, a rare exception to the rule that waqf endowments must consist of immovable property.

The 1885 Census of Egypt recorded Zifta as a city in its own district in Gharbia Governorate; at that time, the population of the city was 11,087 (5,571 men and 5,516 women).

Zefta is well known in the modern Egyptian history during the 1919 uprising, also known as the Egyptian Revolution of 1919, when the British occupation expelled Saad Zaghloul Pasha out of Egypt along with other leaders of the Wafd Party and were exiled to Malta, the people of Zefta, led by Youssef El Guindi, gathered and declared their independence from the crown and named it Zefta Republic. The town of Zefta has also seen the birth of Mostafa Younis, who works in the field of aviation, Fouad Younis, who works as an  accountant and the engineer Moghad Younis.

Zefta, is the location of one of Nile barrages built during 1881–1952 to control the Nile flow.

Notable figures born in or around Zefta include:
Kimon Evan Marengo, Mostafa Kamal Tolba , Mostafa El-Sayed, Mark Ibn Kunbar, Ahmed Seif al-Islam Keshty, Eman Hassaballa Aly, Sameera Moussa and Samir Al Aswad.

See also

 List of cities and towns in Egypt

References

Populated places in Gharbia Governorate
Cities in Egypt